Berghia amakusana is a species of sea slug, an aeolid nudibranch. It is a shell-less marine gastropod mollusc in the family Aeolidiidae.

Distribution
This species was described from Tomioka, Fukushima, Japan.

References

Aeolidiidae
Gastropods described in 1937